Badminton, for the 2017 Island Games, held at the Rackethallen, Visby, Gotland, Sweden in June 2017.

Medal table

Results

References

Island
2017
Badminton